Brazil participated in the 2011 Parapan American Games.

Medalists

Archery

Brazil sent six male and one female athlete to compete.

Athletics

Brazil sent 26 male and 14 female athletes to compete.

Boccia

Brazil sent eight male and four female athletes to compete.

Cycling

Brazil sent eight male and four female athletes to compete. Four male and two female athletes will compete in the road cycling tournament, while four male and two female athletes will compete in the track cycling tournament.

Football 5-a-side

Brazil sent a team of eight athletes to compete.

Goalball

Brazil sent two teams of six athletes each to compete in the men's and women's tournaments.

Judo

Brazil sent seven male and six female athletes to compete.

Powerlifting

Brazil sent ten male and five female athletes to compete.

Sitting volleyball

Brazil sent a team of twelve athletes to compete.

Swimming

Brazil sent 28 male and 11 female swimmers to compete.

Table tennis

Brazil sent 25 male and 7 female table tennis players to compete.

Wheelchair basketball

Brazil sent two teams of twelve athletes to compete in the men's and women's tournaments.

Wheelchair tennis

Brazil sent two male and two female athletes to compete.

References

Nations at the 2011 Parapan American Games
2011 in Brazilian sport
Brazil at the Parapan American Games